Zanthoxylum delagoense is a species of plant in the family Rutaceae. It is endemic to Mozambique.

References

delagoense
Endemic flora of Mozambique
Least concern plants
Least concern biota of Africa
Taxonomy articles created by Polbot